The Regeneration refers to people of all ages who share a common interest in renewable resources, recycling and other means of sustaining the earth's natural environment.

Social networks are enabling members of the Regeneration to interact and share ideas, tools, and resources with each other, increasing the rate at which the actual regeneration of culture and planet can occur.

While not specifically defined, the prefix Re in ReGeneration could be interpreted to include widespread environmental practices such as reusing, recycling and restoring. The concepts of circular design and systems thinking, commonly used by people in the Regeneration, stem from a long line of indigenous agricultural practices and more recently biomimicry and permaculture, a set of design principles centered around whole systems thinking, simulating or directly utilizing the patterns and resilient features observed in natural ecosystems.

The permaculture approach guides us to mimic the patterns and relationships we can find in nature and can be applied to all aspects of human habitation, from agriculture to ecological building, from appropriate technology to education and even economics.

History

The modern environmental movement gained traction in the early 1970s following the United Nations Conference on the Human Environment, the first time multiple nations joined together to discuss the state of the world's environment.

The concept of a generation that includes people of all ages who share a common interest in the environment was first introduced by Dell Chairman and CEO Michael Dell on World Environment Day 2007. Many of the original theories of change came from writers, thinkers, and designers such as Wendell Berry, Buckminster Fuller, David Orr and Frank Lloyd Wright. These individuals saw a shift happening in humanity toward a rekindled connection with nature and inspired monumental changes in our approach and perspectives on topics such as building community, our relationship with agriculture and architecture, as well as the disconnect between modern economics on a finite planet.

There are also more recent thought leaders talking about ecological thinking like Paul Hawken, Kate Raworth, Naomi Klein, David Suzuki, and Bill McKibben, who have modernized the discourse and given the environmental movement a new set of tools in the form of conscious capitalism and positive climate communication.

On December 3, 2016, Kyle Calian founded The Regeneration, a magazine focused on highlighting individuals in the environmental movement who were actively changing the conversation about climate change.

References

External links
 GreenBiz
 Why you need to understand Ecological Design
 The Regeneration

Environmental movements
Cultural generations